Metarbela lornadepewae is a moth in the family Cossidae. It is found in Tanzania, where it has been recorded from the Udzungwa Mountains. The habitat consists of montane and upper montane forests.

The length of the forewings is about 10 mm. The forewings are black with pure white spots along the costal margin. The hindwings are buff yellow, turning brownish olive towards the edge.

Etymology
The species is named for Lorna Anne Depew.

References

Natural History Museum Lepidoptera generic names catalog

Endemic fauna of Tanzania
Metarbelinae
Moths described in 2009